These singles reached number one on the Cash Box Top 100 chart during 1976.

See also
1976 in music
List of Hot 100 number-one singles of 1976 (U.S.)

References
https://web.archive.org/web/20080118170730/http://www.cashboxmagazine.com/archives/70s_files/1976.html
http://musicseek.info/no1hits/1976.htm

1976
United States Cashbox
1976 in American music